Michele Binkley is an American politician serving as a member of the Montana House of Representatives from the 85th district. Elected in November 2020, she assumed office on January 4, 2021. Prior to entering politics, Binkley was an escrow officer at First American Title.

References

External links
 Michele Binkley at VoteSmart

Living people
Republican Party members of the Montana House of Representatives
Women state legislators in Montana
21st-century American politicians
21st-century American women politicians
People from Browning, Montana
1968 births
People from Hamilton, Montana